The Goedert Meat Market, also known as the Main Street Mall, is a historic building located in McGregor, Iowa, United States. The two-story, single-unit, brick building was completed in 1890 in the Italianate style. It maintains the only complete cast-iron storefront in town. The storefront was manufactured by Mesker Bros. Front Builders of St. Louis, Missouri. The facility dates from the time when all aspects of the meat business from slaughter, to processing, to sales were housed in one building. The New York-style meat market was built for John Goedert, who maintained his residence upstairs.  By the turn of the 20th-century it housed Bergman's deli/butcher shop, and remained a butcher shop until 1944. The building was individually listed on the National Register of Historic Places (NRHP) in 1996. In 2002 it was listed as a contributing property in the McGregor Commercial Historic District.

The building was hit by an EF-1 tornado and collapsed on the evening of July 19, 2017. It was removed from the NRHP in 2022.

References

Commercial buildings completed in 1890
Italianate architecture in Iowa
McGregor, Iowa
Buildings and structures in Clayton County, Iowa
National Register of Historic Places in Clayton County, Iowa
Commercial buildings on the National Register of Historic Places in Iowa
Individually listed contributing properties to historic districts on the National Register in Iowa
Former National Register of Historic Places in Iowa